Douglas Matthew Ballard (born May 14, 1957) is an American college football coach, most recently the head coach at Morehead State University, a position he held from 1994 until his firing at the end of the 2012 season. He also served as the head coach at another Kentucky school, Union College, from 1988 to 1993.

Head coaching record

References

1957 births
Living people
Gardner–Webb Runnin' Bulldogs football coaches
Georgetown Tigers football coaches
Morehead State Eagles football coaches
Union (Kentucky) Bulldogs football coaches
People from Davidson, North Carolina